Beloglazov (masculine) or Beloglazova (feminine) is a Russian surname. Notable people with the surname include:

Anatoly Beloglazov (born 1956), Russian Soviet sport wrestler
Galina Beloglazova (born 1967), Russian Soviet rhythmic gymnast
Julia Beloglazova (born 1987), Ukrainian pair skater
Sergei Beloglazov (born 1956), Russian Soviet sport wrestler

Russian-language surnames